Macon High School is a public secondary school in Macon, Missouri.

References

Public high schools in Missouri
High schools in Macon County, Missouri
Educational institutions in the United States with year of establishment missing